Sanapallilanka is situated in East Godavari district in Ainavilli region, in Andhra Pradesh State, India.

References

Villages in East Godavari district